Michael Mansfield is an English barrister and Queen's Counsel.

Michael or Mike Mansfield may also refer to:

 Michael Mansfield (footballer) (born 1971), Australian rules footballer
 Mike Mansfield (Michael Joseph Mansfield, 1903–2001), American Democratic senator from Montana
 Michael Mansfield (diplomat), New Zealand High Commissioner